Dawlish Methodist Church is located on Brunswick Street in the town of Dawlish, Devon, England. It belongs to the circuit of Teignbridge.

History
The church's founding stone was laid by Ebenezer Pardon of Dawlish Water in 1861. A schoolroom was added at the rear of the church in 1883. This is still in use, but has been extensively modernised.

Fire
On 22 November 2015, the church's organ caught fire. This was noticed after smoke began to issue from the organ pump and fire crews were called to the church at 11.22am. The fire was extinguished and no major damage was caused.

References

External links 

Churches completed in 1861
Dawlish
Methodist churches in Devon